Woodcrest Mansion is a historic mansion in Radnor Township, Delaware County, Pennsylvania, Pennsylvania, designed by renowned architect Horace Trumbauer, for James W. Paul, managing partner in Drexel and Company Banking (now JPMorgan Chase). Today, it is one of the oldest buildings on the campus of Cabrini University, where it serves as the main administration building. It was originally built in 1901, but major renovations and additions began almost immediately and continued through 1907, with additional modifications executed in 1914.  It is a three-story, 51 room, 47,000 square feet mansion in the Elizabethan Tudor Revival style.  It was once part of a 238-acre estate, 112 acres of which is Cabrini University. The Estate of  Dr. John T. Dorrance, inventor of the process for condensed soup and president of the Campbell Soup Company, sold to the Missionary Sisters of the Sacred Heart of Jesus in 1953.  Cabrini University (then called Cabrini College) opened in September 1957, and Woodcrest served as its first home.

It was added to the National Register of Historic Places in 2008.

References

Houses on the National Register of Historic Places in Pennsylvania
Tudor Revival architecture in Pennsylvania
Houses completed in 1901
Houses in Delaware County, Pennsylvania
National Register of Historic Places in Delaware County, Pennsylvania
Horace Trumbauer buildings